Marcus Österdahl (born 27 January 1943, in Stockholm, Sweden), is a Swedish musical director and entrepreneur.

The Telstars 
In 1963, Österdahl was one of the founder members of The Telstars, a pop-jazz group consisting of some of the most sought after session musicians in Sweden. They were the "house-band"  in the monthly TV-Show Drop-In backing most artists in the show and were also the support act for The Beatles on their first tour of Sweden in 1963.

Musical career 
After leaving The Telstars in 1966, Österdahl mainly devoted his talent and time to working as an independent arranger/producer for the major record companies. Many well-known Swedish acts were accompanied by Marcus Österdahl's Choir & Orchestra, with about 30 tracks reaching number one on the charts.

Among Österdahl's hits as an arranger is “Du är den ende”, the title track from singer Lill Lindfors’ 1967 gold album. That same year Marcus Österdahl composed, together with producer Curt Pettersson and lyricist Patrice Hellberg, the Swedish entry "Som en dröm" for the Eurovision Song Contest in Vienna.
 
Due to the constant demand for time in recording studios, Österdahl developed an interest in the business operation of these highly technical facilities and opened his first commercial recording studio in 1973. The independent studio, which was named Marcus Music, was equipped with the first 24-track tape recorder in Sweden and a few years later, the first computerised mixing desk in Scandinavia. ABBA were one of the many acts using the studio, recording most of ABBA – The Album at Marcus Music.

Business development 
Further associated business developments included an audio music cassette plant, a record label for new talent and publishing interests. By 1977 the Polygram Group offered to acquire the company, provided that Österdahl would accept a position as Head of A&R for the Nordic market. However, Österdahl planned to expand Marcus Music and decided to remain independent.

The Swedish company established a UK subsidiary in 1978 and acquired the lease on the legendary CTS Studios off Westbourne Grove. It was a landmark home to most Star Wars and James Bond film scores, and Frank Sinatra recorded his 1962 album Sinatra Sings Great Songs from Great Britain in this studio. Following a substantial refurbishment of the premises, Marcus Recording Studios installed state-of-the-art equipment and the spacious Studio One featured the first 48-track facility in London.

Ten years later the Virgin Group was expanding and Richard Branson invited Marcus Österdahl for lunch on his houseboat in Little Venice on 12 February 1988 to discuss the acquisition of Österdahl's business interests. Instead, Österdahl acquired a development property for a new studio complex in Fulham, West London. The purpose built facility provided four very different studios under the same roof and established the first residential London studio with a small hotel and licensed bar and restaurant for musicians, artists and their friends. Marcus Recording Studios were used by artists such as Take That, Robert Plant, Chris de Burgh, Europe, Jamiroquai, Spice Girls, Meat Loaf, Bob Geldof, Holly Johnson, Dave Stewart, East 17, Ocean Colour Scene, Radiohead, Brand New Heavies, Boyzone, All Saints, Peter Andre, N-Trance, Sweet and many others.

The Swedish company was sold in 1981 to Soundtrade Studios and is a commercial recording complex in Stockholm – Sweden.

In 1999 the Fulham studios were sold to Worldsport.com a start-up by Alan Callan, the former head of Led Zeppelin's Swan Song record label as well as Jimmy Page's business manager.

In 2023 Marcus Österdahl Instrumentals an orchestral double album from studio recordings produced and arranged by Österdahl in 1976/77 is released for global streaming.

References

Living people
Swedish session musicians
1943 births
Swedish composers
Swedish male composers
Swedish music arrangers
Swedish record producers
Musicians from Stockholm